Howard Avenue may refer to:

Howard Avenue (Windsor, Ontario), Canada
Howard Avenue (Tampa), Florida
Howard Avenue (New Haven), Connecticut
Howard Avenue (New Orleans), Louisiana